The Best Horror of the Year: Volume Five is a horror fiction anthology edited by Ellen Datlow that was published in August 2013. It is the fifth volume in The Best Horror of the Year series.

Contents
The book includes twenty-eight horror stories, all first published in 2012. The book also includes a summation by Datlow, and a list of honorable mentions for the year. The stories are as follows:

 Lucy Taylor: "Nikishi"
 Dan Chaon: "Little America" 
 Jeffrey Ford: "A Natural History of Autumn" 
 Kij Johnson: "Mantis Wives" 
 Stephanie Crawford and Duane Swierczynski: "Tender as Teeth"
 Ramsey Campbell: "The Callers"
 Kevin McCann: "Two Poems for Hill House" (poem)
 Terry Dowling: "Mariners' Round"
 Gemma Files: "Nanny Grey"
 Tamsyn Muir: "The Magician's Apprentice"
 Gary McMahon: "Kill All Monsters"
 Ian Rogers: "The House on Ashley Avenue"
 Jay Wilburn: "Dead Song"
 Sandi Leibowitz: "Sleeping, I Was Beauty"  (poem)
 Margo Lanagan: "Bajazzle"
 Conrad Williams: "The Pike"
 Bruce McAllister: "The Crying Child"
 Amber Sparks: "This Circus the World"
 Gary McMahon: "Some Pictures in an Album"
 Nathan Ballingrud: "Wild Acre"
 Megan Arkenberg: "Final Exam"
 Stephen Bacon: "None So Blind"
 Priya Sharma: "The Ballad of Boomtown"
 Adam Nevill: "Pig Thing"
 Richard Gavin: "The Word-Made Flesh"
 Claire Massey: "Into the Penny Arcade"
 Lucy A. Snyder: "Magdala Amygdala"
 Laird Barron: "Frontier Death Song"

References

External links
  
 Review: The Best Horror Of The Year Volume Five edited by Ellen Datlow

2013 anthologies
Horror anthologies
Night Shade Books books